Mordant brown 33 (MB33) is 2,4-diamino-5-(2-hydroxy-5-nitrophenylazo) benzene sulfonic acid sodium salt.

The UV-Visible spectra of MB33 in all mixtures investigated display three absorption bands in 50% ethanol within all the pH ranges 1.5-13.3 using Thiel buffer the maximum absorption of these bands is located at 438, 453 and a double head band at  410 and 475 nm . The band at 438 nm corresponds to absorption attributed to the cationic form (LH6) of MB33 (whereas L indicates to the parent structure of ligand without hydrogen protons) and disappears at pH > 3.0. The band at 453 nm corresponds to the absorption of the neutral form of the reagent (LH5-). The double head bands at 410 and 475 nm correspond to the di-anionic (LH42−) of MB33.

References

Azo dyes
Nitrobenzenes
Phenols
Benzenesulfonates
Organic sodium salts